Leino Rei (born 18 March 1972) is an Estonian actor and theatre director.

Graduated from the Estonian Institute of Humanities in 1998 with a degree in acting (Baccalaureus Artium) and in 2018 with a Master of Arts in Social Sciences in Cultural Management from the University of Tartu.1994-2002 he was an actor at the studio Theatrum, from 2002 to2006 at NUKU Theatre. 2006-2017 he was a freelance actor and director. Besides theatre roles, he has also participated in films and television series. He has performed in various Estonian theaters in about 50 productions and created 25productions. He has been awarded twice with the highest children's theater award of the Estonian Theater Association (2006,  2015). Currently works at the Estonian Theatre for Young Audiences as the Manager of the International Visual Theater Festival Tallinn Treff and the Baltic Visual Theater Showcase.

Selected filmography
2002	Ferdinand	(feature film; role; Dumb man)
2004	Bussi juures (documentary feature film; role: Narrator)	
2006-2007 Ohtlik lend	(television series; role: Marek)
 2010 Riigimehed (television series; role: Doctor)
 2010-2014	Õnne 13	(television series; role: Vaapo Väluste)
 2012-2016 Kättemaksukontor (television series; role: various)	
 2013 Väikelinna detektiivid ja Valge Daami saladus (feature film; role: Mait Maidla)
 2014 Väikelinna detektiivid (television series; role: Mait Maidla)
 2016 Klassikokkutulek (feature film; role: Roland)
 2017 Lotte lood (television series; role: Rabbit Wolfgang)
 2018 Lõks (television series; role: Tauno, Taavi)
 2018 Tuliliilia  (feature film; role: Inspector)

References

Living people
1972 births
Estonian male stage actors
Estonian male film actors
Estonian male television actors
21st-century Estonian male actors
Estonian theatre directors
University of Tartu alumni